The Pittsburgh Miners were a professional soccer club based in Pittsburgh, Pennsylvania. They were a member of the American Soccer League in 1975 but folded at the end of the season after finishing with a record of 1-16-3.  Joe Luxbacher was the top scorer with six goals and 4 assists
.

1975 roster
 Mike Angellotti
Ciro Baldini
 Charlie Duccilli
 Bill Fann
 John Fitzgerald
 Mickey Fitzgerald
 Tom Fitzgerald 
 Billy Haines
 Sonny Ideozu
Galo Iquirre
 Bob Kohlmyer
 Dennis Kohlmyer 
 Joe Luxbacher 
 Ron McEachen 
 Tom Martin 
 Lew Meehl
 Ron Nentwig
 Art Richardson 
 Skip Roderick
 Stan Startzell
 Sam Viecelli 
 Lenny Williams
 Ed Yohman

Head coach

1975 Game Results

Year-by-year

References

Defunct soccer clubs in Pennsylvania
Miners
American Soccer League (1933–1983) teams
1975 disestablishments in Pennsylvania
Association football clubs disestablished in 1975